Recurvaria trigonophorella is a moth of the family Gelechiidae. It is found in Colombia.

References

Moths described in 1877
Recurvaria
Moths of South America